Roger Huerta (born May 20, 1983) is an American mixed martial artist currently fighting in the lightweight division. He initially gained exposure by competing in the lightweight division of the Ultimate Fighting Championship, Bellator Fighting Championships and later ONE Championship.

Early life
Huerta was born in Los Angeles, California. He had an arduous childhood with life continuing to be difficult throughout his teen years. Despite adversity, he has overcome many challenges, ultimately living what has been described as a "life that Hollywood producers make movies about". Born to Lydia and Rogelio Huerta in Los Angeles, California, he spent the first 6 years of his life in Texas. His father became heavily involved in drugs and alcohol and began an affair with another woman that led to a separation with Lydia.

Huerta's mother became physically abusive, and when Huerta came to school with bruises covering his body, Child Protective Services intervened, placing him in a foster home for a short time. In 1990, Lydia lost the custody battle for Huerta and fled the United States with Huerta, age 7, to her parents’ home in El Salvador. Shortly upon arriving, Lydia abandoned Huerta leaving him in the care of his grandparents at the time of the El Salvadoran Civil War. She returned a year later only to leave him on his father's doorstep in Texas. That was the last time he saw his mother. Huerta openly talks about the mental and physical abuse he endured from his father and stepmother in that year. The next year he was relocated to Mexico and left with his father's parents living in poverty. They would often send him out into the streets selling picture frames to tourists to make money. For a brief time, his father and stepmother came back into his life where they moved to the Rio Grande Valley and enrolled him halfway through the year into 3rd grade. At 12 his father left home, and soon after Roger was kicked out by his stepmother. He lived on the streets for many years and survived by joining a youth gang. He often slept in alleys and on rooftops, but was encouraged by his friends to remain in school where he could eat a provided breakfast and lunch.

He occasionally stayed with friends and just before his freshman year, his life began to turn around for the better. Maria King, his friend's mother, obtained legal custody of him and the three moved to Austin, Texas where he attended David Crockett High School (Austin, Texas). For one of the first times in his life he found himself in a stable environment and became quite popular in school and joined many of the school's sports teams including football and wrestling. It was there he met Jo Ramirez, his English teacher, where she learned about his troubled childhood in a conversation discussing his future ambitions. Furthermore, Bryan Ashford, the school's wrestling coach, took a special interest in Huerta and continued to support him in division wrestling. Ramirez, already a mother of seven, adopted Huerta in 2002 at the age of 19.

Ashford coached Huerta and with the help of Ramirez, aided him in applying for a collegiate wrestling scholarship. Huerta attends Augsburg University in Minneapolis, Minnesota with one year remaining in a Business Management bachelor's degree and resided in St. Paul, Minnesota.

Huerta worked for a time as a bouncer and construction worker.

Career
In Huerta's pre-UFC career, his first loss came as a result of a dislocated jaw early in the finals of the SuperBrawl 36 tournament against Ryan Schultz on June 18, 2004, his third match of the day.

Ultimate Fighting Championship

Huerta was originally slated to make his UFC debut against Hermes Franca at UFC 61, but was forced to withdraw from the fight as the result of an elbow injury. He won his first six fights in the UFC, the first at UFC 63 against Jason Dent, which was declared "Fight of the Night".

His next fight was against UFC newcomer John Halverson at UFC 67. The fight ended by TKO after 19 seconds of round one after Huerta landed a knee to the shoulder/head area of a grounded Halverson, knocking him down and finishing him with punches. The end of the bout was controversial as knees to the head of grounded opponents are illegal under UFC rules. It was later shown in a replay that Huerta's knee was actually to the shoulder rather than to the head.

Next he fought in a three-round war with Leonard Garcia at UFC 69. winning via unanimous decision. After the fight, in May 2007, Huerta became the first mixed martial artist to appear on the cover of Sports Illustrated Magazine, for a story on the rising popularity of mixed martial arts.

Huerta won his next two fights against Doug Evans and Alberto Crane.  He then faced Clay Guida in the 2007's The Ultimate Fighter 6 Finale. Huerta was visibly frustrated at losing in the grappling exchanges from Guida's wrestling offensive, spending a large part of the bout on his back fending off "ground and pound" from his opponent. Late in the second round, Huerta was stunned by a punch to the face while trying to get to his feet, but managed to survive until the end of the round. Early in the third round, Huerta looked to engage Guida on his feet, connecting with a knee to the face while attempting a kick Guida.  After a brief flurry, Huerta took his back and submitted Guida by rear naked choke very late in the fight for an impressive come-from-behind win.

Huerta then lost his next fight by unanimous decision at UFC 87 against Kenny Florian.

On January 9, 2009, Huerta announced an indefinite hiatus from MMA to further pursue opportunities in acting.

In order to complete his UFC contract, Huerta returned on September 16, 2009, but lost to Gray Maynard at UFC Fight Night 19. After a back-and-forth fight, he would end up losing a split decision in his bout against Maynard.

Bellator Fighting Championships
Despite having previously announced on his personal Twitter account that he was in talks with Strikeforce, Huerta eventually signed with Bellator Fighting Championships. He was one of eight men to compete in the second season lightweight tournament, with the winner receiving a title shot against Eddie Alvarez.<ref></</ref>

His first fight in the tournament took place at Bellator 13.  Huerta defeated opponent Chad Hinton via submission (kneebar) at 0:56 of the third round.

His second fight in the tournament took place at Bellator 17. Huerta lost the semi-final to Pat Curran by a controversial unanimous decision (29-28 from all three judges).

However, on August 12 it was announced that Huerta would be fighting Bellator Lightweight Champion Eddie Alvarez, after Curran had to pull out of the fight due to a slap tear in his right shoulder. The Lightweight belt was not on the line when the two met on October 21, 2010 at Bellator 33 in Philadelphia. He lost the fight via doctor stoppage at the end of the 2nd round.

Post-Bellator
Huerta fought against War Machine in a welterweight bout in the main event of Ultimate Warrior Fighting 1. Huerta lost the fight via TKO after he suffered a fractured rib during the final scramble in the third round where he rolled out of War Machine's submission armbar attempts to claim side control. From there, War Machine escaped from Huerta's side mount to directly take full mount with ease. Machine then rained down punches for the referee stoppage at three minutes and nine seconds.

ONE Championship
Huerta signed with the Asian-based promotion ONE Championship in 2012.  He was scheduled to fight Phil Baroni in a welterweight bout at ONE FC: Destiny of Warriors on June 23 but Baroni was pulled from the fight after suffering a TKO loss in a fight 3 weeks before the event. Huerta instead fought Zorobabel Moreira at the event, and was defeated via KO (soccer kick) in the second round.

After two years away from the sport, Huerta returned to One FC on August 29, 2014. He faced undefeated Christian Holley at ONE FC: Reign of Champions and won the fight via TKO in the first round.

Bellator return
After seven-and-a-half years away from the promotion, Huerta re-signed with Bellator MMA for one fight in 2018. He faced Benson Henderson in the main event at Bellator 196 on April 6, 2018. Huerta lost the bout via submission in the second round.

Subsequently, in May 2018, Huerta signed a new, multi-fight contract with Bellator.

Huerta faced Patricky Freire on September 21, 2018 at Bellator 205. He lost the fight via knockout in the second round.

Huerta faced Sidney Outlaw at Bellator 234 on November 14, 2019. He lost the fight via unanimous decision.

Huerta faced Chris Gonzalez at Bellator 255 on April 2, 2021. He lost the bout after tapping due to strikes in the third round.

On April 19, 2021, it was announced that Huerta was released by Bellator.

Training
Huerta trained for his UFC fight against Kenny Florian with Greg Jackson's Submission Fighting. For his Bellator debut, he spent time in Thailand and put together a training camp with MMA fighters such as Yves Edwards (UFC), Shad Lierley (Bellator), Jared Hess (Bellator), Dave Menne, and Jeff Clark out of the Phil Cardella / Relson Gracie Academy in Austin, Texas.

Film
Huerta made his acting debut as Miguel Caballero Rojo in the live action motion picture Tekken. He also starred alongside Kimbo Slice, Frank Mir, and Heath Herring in Circle of Pain, a 2010 direct-to-video film.

Personal life
Huerta previously dated actress Laura Prepon from 2008 to 2009.

In August 2010, Huerta engaged in a street fight outside of a bar at approximately 2 A.M. CST in Austin, Texas. Video footage provided by TMZ shows a man alleged to be Huerta is seen exchanging words with and defending himself against a man, Rashad Bobino, a former Texas Longhorns linebacker, who had just assaulted a woman.

Championships and awards 
Ultimate Fighting Championship
Fight of the Night (Three times)
2007 Fight of the Year
Tied (Neil Magny, Kevin Holland) for most wins in a calendar year (5)
International Sport Karate Association
ISKA MMA Welterweight Championship (One time)
International Fighting Championship
IFC World Lightweight Championship (One time)

Mixed martial arts record

|-
|Loss
|align=center|24–13–1 (1)
|Chris Gonzalez
|TKO (submission to punches)
|Bellator 255
|
|align=center|3
|align=center|3:01
|Uncasville, Connecticut, United States
|
|-
|Loss
|align=center| 24–12–1 (1)
|Sidney Outlaw
|Decision (unanimous)
|Bellator 234
|
|align=center|3
|align=center|5:00
|Tel Aviv, Israel
|
|-
|Loss
|align=center| 24–11–1 (1)
|Patricky Freire
|KO (punch)
|Bellator 205
|
|align=center|2
|align=center|0:43
|Boise, Idaho, United States
|
|-
|Loss
|align=center|  (1)
|Benson Henderson
|Submission (guillotine choke)
|Bellator 196
|
|align=center|2
|align=center|0:49
|Budapest, Hungary
|
|-
| Win
| align=center| 24–9–1 (1)
| Hayder Hassan
| DQ (illegal elbows)
| Phoenix FC 4
| 
| align=center| 2
| align=center| 0:55
| Dubai, UAE
| 
|-
| Win
| align=center| 23–9–1 (1)
| Adrian Pang
| Decision (split)
| ONE 49: Defending Honor
| 
| align=center| 3
| align=center| 5:00
| Kallang, Singapore
| 
|-
| Loss
| align=center| 22–9–1 (1)
| Ariel Sexton
| TKO (submission to punches)
| ONE Championship: Dynasty of Champions
| 
| align=center| 3
| align=center| 3:53
| Anhui, China
| 
|-
| Loss
| align=center| 22–8–1 (1)
| Koji Ando
| Decision (unanimous)
| ONE Championship: Odyssey of Champions
| 
| align=center| 3
| align=center| 5:00
| Jakarta, Indonesia
| 
|-
| Win
| align=center| 22–7–1 (1)
| Christian Holley
| TKO (punches)
| ONE FC: Reign of Champions
| 
| align=center| 1
| align=center| 3:13
| Dubai, UAE
|  
|-
| Loss 
| align=center| 21–7–1 (1)
| Zorobabel Moreira
| KO (soccer kick)
| ONE Fighting Championship: Destiny of Warriors
| 
| align=center| 2
| align=center| 3:53
| Kuala Lumpur, Malaysia
|
|-
| Loss 
| align=center| 21–6–1 (1)
| War Machine
| TKO (punches)
| UWF 1: Huerta vs. War Machine
| 
| align=center| 3
| align=center| 3:09
| Pharr, Texas, United States
|  
|-
| Loss
| align=center| 21–5–1 (1)
| Eddie Alvarez
| TKO (doctor stoppage)
| Bellator 33
| 
| align=center| 2
| align=center| 5:00
| Philadelphia, Pennsylvania, United States
| 
|-
| Loss
| align=center| 21–4–1 (1)
| Pat Curran
| Decision (unanimous)
| Bellator 17
| 
| align=center| 3
| align=center| 5:00
| Boston, Massachusetts, United States
|  
|-
| Win
| align=center| 21–3–1 (1)
| Chad Hinton
| Submission (kneebar)
|  Bellator 13
| 
| align=center| 3
| align=center| 0:56
| Hollywood, Florida, United States
|  
|-
| Loss
| align=center| 20–3–1 (1)
| Gray Maynard
| Decision (split)
| UFC Fight Night: Diaz vs. Guillard
| 
| align=center| 3
| align=center| 5:00
| Oklahoma City, Oklahoma, United States
| 
|-
| Loss
| align=center| 20–2–1 (1)
| Kenny Florian
| Decision (unanimous)
| UFC 87
| 
| align=center| 3
| align=center| 5:00
| Minneapolis, Minnesota, United States
| 
|-
| Win
| align=center| 20–1–1 (1)
| Clay Guida
| Submission (rear-naked choke)
| The Ultimate Fighter 6 Finale
| 
| align=center| 3
| align=center| 0:51
| Las Vegas, Nevada, United States
| 
|-
| Win
| align=center| 19–1–1 (1)
| Alberto Crane
| TKO (punches)
| UFC 74
| 
| align=center| 3
| align=center| 1:50
| Las Vegas, Nevada, United States
| 
|-
| Win
| align=center| 18–1–1 (1)
| Doug Evans
| TKO (punches)
| The Ultimate Fighter 5 Finale
| 
| align=center| 2
| align=center| 3:30
| Las Vegas, Nevada, United States
| 
|-
| Win
| align=center| 17–1–1 (1)
| Leonard Garcia
| Decision (unanimous)
| UFC 69
| 
| align=center| 3
| align=center| 5:00
| Houston, Texas, United States
|  
|-
| Win
| align=center| 16–1–1 (1)
| John Halverson
| TKO (punches)
| UFC 67
| 
| align=center| 1
| align=center| 0:19
| Las Vegas, Nevada, United States
| 
|-
| Win
| align=center| 15–1–1 (1)
| Jason Dent
| Decision (unanimous)
| UFC 63: Hughes vs. Penn
| 
| align=center| 3
| align=center| 5:00
| Anaheim, California, United States
| 
|-
| Win
| align=center| 14–1–1 (1)
| Joe Camacho
| TKO (punches)
| Raze MMA" Fight Night
| 
| align=center| 2
| align=center| 2:43
| San Diego, California, United States
| 
|-
| Win
| align=center| 13–1–1 (1)
| Dan Swift
| TKO (punches)
| Extreme Challenge 66
| 
| align=center| 2
| align=center| 0:51
| Medina, Minnesota, United States
| 
|-
| Win
| align=center| 12–1–1 (1)
| Lee King
| Submission (rear-naked choke)
| IFC: Rumble on the Rio 2
| 
| align=center| 1
| align=center| 0:50
| Texas, United States
| 
|-
| Win
| align=center| 11–1–1 (1)
| Matt Wiman
| Decision (unanimous)
| FFC 15: Fiesta Las Vegas
| 
| align=center| 3
| align=center| 5:00
| Medina, Minnesota, United States
| 
|-
| Win
| align=center| 10–1–1 (1)
| Brad Blackburn
| TKO (corner stoppage)
| IFC: Rock N' Rumble
| 
| align=center| 3
| align=center| 2:19
| Texas, United States
| 
|-
| NC
| align=center| 9–1–1 (1)
| Melvin Guillard
| NC (overturned)
| rowspan=3|Freestyle Fighting Championship 14
| rowspan=3|
| align=center| 3
| align=center| 5:00
| rowspan=3|Biloxi, Mississippi, United States
|  
|-
| Win
| align=center| 9–1–1
| Kenny Jerrell
| TKO (punches)
| align=center| 1
| align=center| 2:15
| 
|-
| Win
| align=center| 8–1–1
| Steve Kinnison
| Submission (rear-naked choke)
| align=center| 2
| align=center| 2:57
| 
|-
| Win
| align=center| 7–1–1
| Naoyuki Kotani
| TKO (punches)
| Xtreme Fighting Organization 4
| 
| align=center| 1
| align=center| 1:29
| Lakemoor, Illinois, United States
| 
|-
| Win
| align=center| 6–1–1
| Jake Short
| Submission (rear-naked choke)
| Extreme Challenge 60
| 
| align=center| 3
| align=center| 0:37
| Medina, Minnesota, United States
| 
|-
| Win
| align=center| 5–1–1
| Matt Brady
| TKO (punches)
| Extreme Challenge 59
| 
| align=center| 1
| align=center| 3:12
| Medina, Minnesota, United States
| 
|-
| Loss
| align=center| 4–1–1
| Ryan Schultz
| TKO (jaw injury)
| rowspan=3|SuperBrawl 36
| rowspan=3|
| align=center| 1
| align=center| 1:47
| rowspan=3|Honolulu, Hawaii, United States
|
|-
| Win
| align=center| 4–0–1
| Mike Aina
| Decision (split)
| align=center| 3
| align=center| 3:00
| 
|-
| Win
| align=center| 3–0–1
| Harris Sarmiento
| TKO (punches)
| align=center| 3
| align=center| 2:12
| 
|-
| Draw
| align=center| 2–0–1
| Joe Jordan
| Draw
| Extreme Challenge 56
| 
| align=center| 3
| align=center| 3:00
| Medina, Minnesota, United States
| 
|-
| Win
| align=center| 2–0
| Jeff Carlson
| DQ (headbutt)
| rowspan=2|EC – Best of the Best 2 – Day Event
| rowspan=2|
| align=center| 2
| align=center| 4:52
| rowspan=2|Anoka, Minnesota, United States
| 
|-
| Win
| align=center| 1–0
| Shane Lavafor
| TKO (punches)
| align=center| 1
| align=center| 2:12
|

See also
 List of ONE Championship alumni

References

External links
 Official MySpace of Roger Huerta
 
 
 Sports Illustrated article on Roger Huerta

1983 births
American sportspeople of Salvadoran descent
American mixed martial artists of Mexican descent
Ultimate Fighting Championship male fighters
Augsburg University alumni
American male film actors
American male mixed martial artists
Mixed martial artists from Texas
Lightweight mixed martial artists
Mixed martial artists utilizing wrestling
Mixed martial artists utilizing Brazilian jiu-jitsu
Living people
American practitioners of Brazilian jiu-jitsu
People awarded a black belt in Brazilian jiu-jitsu
21st-century American male actors
American male actors of Mexican descent